The following is a list of flags of French Indochina from 18 February 1859 to 9 March 1945.

Union flags

 Government

 Military

Subjects
 Annam and Tonkin

 Laos

 Cambodia

 Cochinchina

Organizations
 Political organizations

 Political parties

 Religional organizations

 Social organizations

 Illegal organizations

See also

 French colonial flags
 List of flags of Vietnam
 List of flags of Laos
 List of flags of Cambodia
 French possessions and colonies in Southeast Asia

References

 L'enseignement au Vietnam pendant la période coloniale, 1862–1945 : La formation des intellectuels vietnamiens

French Indochina